The 1979 Arkansas State Indians football team was an American football team that represented Arkansas State University as a member of the Southland Conference during the 1979 NCAA Division I-A football season. In their first season under head coach Larry Lacewell, Arkansas State compiled an overall record of 4–7 record with a conference mark of 1–4, placing in a three-way tie for fourth in the Southland .

Schedule

1980 NFL Draft

The following Indian was selected in the 1980 NFL draft.

References

Arkansas State
Arkansas State Red Wolves football seasons
Arkansas State Indians football